Cheryline Ernestine Lim (born 10 March 1982), known by her stage name Che'Nelle, is an Australian singer-songwriter signed to Universal Music Japan.

Early life
Cheryline Ernestine Lim was born on 10 March 1982, to a Chinese father, and a mother of Indian and Dutch heritage. Born in Kota Kinabalu, Sabah, Malaysia, Lim and her family moved to Perth, Australia when she was 10 years old. As a child she gained the attention of her father after singing in his karaoke lounge, seeing her talent. She later started writing and producing her own music in her home studio. Sir Charles Dixon discovered her talents, after she uploaded some of her music onto Myspace. Dixon took her material to Virgin Records and Virgin flew Che'nelle to New York City at the end of 2005 to meet with representatives from the label. The chairman of the label and longtime music business baron, Jason Flom, signed her immediately. Within two days, she had completed the deal and was marketed as a world-class artist.
Che'nelle worked as a promotions assistant before moving to New York in January after signing a six-album deal with Virgin Records America. In Australia, she is represented by EMI.

2006–08: Things Happen for a Reason
She performed as the opening act on American rapper Kanye Wests Australian tour in March 2006.

Her debut album Things Happen for a Reason was released on 25 September 2007 in Japan and 29 October 2007 in Australia.
The first single from this album was "I Fell in Love with the DJ" featuring reggae artist Cham. The song was also produced in Bahasa Malaysia with the title of "DJ yang Ku Puja".

She also co-wrote American singer and former Pussycat Dolls member Carmit Bachars song "Fierce", Australian singer Ricki-Lee Coulters debut single "Hell No!" and English singer Leona Lewis's song "Can't Breathe".

2009–present
Her second album was later confirmed and given the working title Feel Good, named after the first single from the album.

The first single "Feel Good" from this album is strongly influenced by reggae and dancehall music just like her first single "I Fell in Love with the DJ" from her debut album (Things Happen for a Reason, 2007) which features Jamaican dancehall artist "Cham". The music video for "Feel Good" premiered online on 11 January 2010.

The album Feel Good was released on 10 February 2010 in Japan via EMI Japan.

The album garnered the singles "Feel Good" and "Missing".

Her third album and first cover album, called Luv Songs was released on 20 July 2011 in Japan only, which featured covers of songs by American R&B singers such as Ne-Yo, Minnie Ripperton and Whitney Houston and also songs in Japanese.

In 2015, Che'Nelle was invited to the touring ice show Fantasy on Ice, where she performed live with figure skater and two-time Olympic champion, Yuzuru Hanyu, to the song "Believe" amongst others.

Discography

 Things Happen for a Reason (2007)
 Feel Good (2010)
 Believe (2012)
 Aishiteru (2013)
 @Chenelleworld (2015)
 Destiny (2017)
 Metamorphosis (2017)

Filmography

Awards and nominations

References

External links
 Official Website
 Universal Music Japan Official Profile
 Ameblo Blog
 Official Fan Club
 Official MySpace Profile
 Official Facebook Profile
 Official Twitter Profile
 

1983 births
Living people
Malaysian people of Chinese descent
Malaysian people of Indian descent
Malaysian people of Dutch descent
Malaysian expatriates in Japan
Malaysian emigrants to Australia
Australian people of Chinese descent
Australian people of Indian descent
Australian people of Dutch descent
People from Sabah
Reggae fusion artists
Malaysian rhythm and blues singers
Australian expatriates in Japan
CheNelle
People who lost Malaysian citizenship
21st-century Australian singers
21st-century Australian women singers
Australian rhythm and blues singers
Capitol Records artists
Universal Music Group artists
EMI Music Japan artists
Virgin Records artists
Universal Music Japan artists
Fantasy on Ice guest artists